KGON (92.3 FM) is a commercial radio station in Portland, Oregon. The station airs a classic rock radio format and is owned by Audacy, Inc. KGON broadcasts in the HD Radio format.  Its HD2 subchannel formerly carried a blues format, known as "Waterfront Blues Radio."

KGON's offices and studios are located south of Downtown Portland on Bancroft Street. The transmitter site is in the city's Southwest Hills district, off SW Seymour Street.  KGON has an effective radiated power (ERP) of 97,000 watts (100,000 watts with beam tilt), which covers much of Northwestern Oregon and Southwestern Washington.

Programming
KGON competes with iHeartMedia-owned KFBW. While KFBW plays mostly rock from the 1980s, 1990s and a few 2000s titles, KGON goes back as far as The Beatles for some selections and rarely plays titles later than 1990. At 10 p.m. on weeknights, KGON carries "The Mens Room," a syndicated hot talk show from co-owned KISW in Seattle. The rest of KGON's weekday schedule is made up of local DJs.

History
The station signed on the air on December 6, 1967 as KLIQ-FM.  It was the FM counterpart to KLIQ (AM 1290), which is no longer on the air.  The two stations were owned by the Cascade Broadcasting Company and simulcasted a talk radio format.  Because KLIQ was a daytimer, programming could only be heard on KLIQ-FM after dark.

In 1973, as more people bought radios that received FM stations, KLIQ-FM was sold to KYXI, Inc., the same firm that owned KYXI (now AM 1520, KXET).  On February 1, 1974, the new owners changed the format to album-oriented rock under new call sign KGON. The first song after the flip was "Here Comes the Sun" by The Beatles. The flip put KGON in competition with KINK, which went on the air in 1968 as a freeform radio station, along with KQIV, which signed on in 1972 playing progressive rock.  KGON was programmed with a more structured format, playing only the most popular tracks from the top-selling rock albums. It would continue in this direction until November 4, 1992, when it shifted to its current classic rock direction.

In 1992, KGON and KYXI were bought by Apogee Communications for $5.5 million.  In 1995, the station changed hands after just three years when Entercom acquired KGON.

References

External links
 
 

GON
Classic rock radio stations in the United States
Radio stations established in 1967
1967 establishments in Oregon
Audacy, Inc. radio stations